Eurasian Universities Union EURAS is a non-profit Eurasia organization affiliated with the European Association for Quality Assurance in Higher Education (ENQA)  founded by seven state universities from Eurasia to establish collaborations between European and Asian Universities and to exchange faculty, students and staff. The Project is similar to the EU's Erasmus Programme but covers European (including those in non-EU countries) and Asian Universities.

Members 
The seven founding members of the organization are:
 Çanakkale 18 Mart University, Turkey
 Gabrova Technical University, Bulgaria
 Institute of Management, Business and Law, Russia
 Istanbul Aydın University, Turkey
 Khazar University, Azerbaijan
 Komrat State University, Moldova
 Selçuk University, Turkey

EURAS members recognize each other, and include:

 ABMS the Open University of Switzerland	Switzerland
 Academy of Public Administration	Moldova
 Al-al-Bayt University	Jordan
 Almaty Technological University	Kazakhstan
 Al-Qadisiya University	Iraq
 American University for Humanities	Georgia
 American University in the Emirates	UAE
 Amirkabir University of Technology	Iran
 Andrei Şaguna University-Constanta	Romania
 An-Najah National University	Palestine
 Asfendiyarov Kazakh National Medical University	Kazakhstan
 Azerbaijan State Economy University	Azerbaijan
 Baghdad University	Iraq
 Bahria University	Pakistan
 Baku Asiya University	Azerbaijan
 Baku State University	Azerbaijan
 Belgrade Banking Academy	Serbia
 Budapest Business School	Hungary
 Business Academy Aarhus	Denmark
 Business School Notenboom	The Netherlands
 Catholic Kwandong University	Republic of Korea
 Caucasian Institute of Democratic Integration	Georgia
 Crimea State Engineers and Pedagogical	Ukraine
 Dagestan State Pedagogical University	Dagestan
 David Tvildiani Medical University	Georgia
 Dimitrie Cantemir Christian University	Romania
 EMUNI University	Slovenia
 Epoka University	Albania
 European College “JURIDICA”	Kosovo
 Final International University	Turkish Republic of North Cyprus
 Fırat University	Turkey
 Gazi University	Turkey
 Geneva Business School	Switzerland
 Gotse Delcev University	Macedonia
 Gulf Medical University - Ajman	UAE
 Hamdard University	Pakistan
 Higher College of Technology	UAE
 ILIRIA Royal University	Kosovo
 Institute of System Technologies	Russia
 International Business School CESTE	Spain
 International University of Sarajevo	Bosnia and Herzegovina
 International University of Struga	Macedonia
 Islamic Gaza University	Palestine
 Jahan Institute of Higher Education	Afghanistan
 Karachai Circassia University	Russia
 Kazakhstan Institute for Strategic Studies	Kazakhstan
 Kazan Federal University	Russia
 Kırklareli University	Turkey
 Kharazmi University Tehran Iran
 Konstantin Preslavsky University of Shumen	Bulgaria
 Manas University	Kyrgyzstan
 Medical University of Plovdiv	Bulgaria
 Mediterranean University of Albania	Albania
 Middlesex University London	United Kingdom
 Nakhchivan University	Azerbaijan
 National Academy of Sciences of the Republic of Kazakhstan	Kazakhstan
 National University of Water Management and Natural Resources Use	Ukraine
 Odessa State Environmental University	Ukraine
 Odessa State Polytechnic National University	Ukraine
 Odlar Yurdu Universiteti	Azerbaijan
 Penza State University	Russia
 Sagar Institute of Research, Technology and Science	India
 Sapienza University of Rome	Italy
 Sinai University	Egypt
 Sapir Academic College	Israel
 South-West University "Neofit Rilski"	Bulgaria
 Spiru Haret University
 State University of Tetova	Macedonia
 Superior University	Pakistan
 Tajik State University	Tajikistan
 Tbilisi State University	Georgia
 Technical University of Sophia	Bulgaria
 The University of Kufa	Iraq
 Tiraspol Interregional University	 Moldova
 University College of Applied Science	Palestine
 University College of Applied Science in Safety	Croatia
 University of Al-Muntansiriyah	Iraq
 University of Bucharest	Romania
 University of Economics and Management	Ukraine
 University of Naples I'Orienale	Italy
 University of Palermo	Italy
 University of Porto	Portugal
 University of Prishtina	Kosovo
 University of Raparin	Iraq
 University of the Aegean	Greece
 University Technical Malaysia Melaka	Malaysia
 Usman Institute of Technology	Pakistan
 Vasile Goldis Western University Arad	Romania
 VUZF University	 Bulgaria

See also
 European Association for Quality Assurance in Higher Education

References

Education in the European Union
Higher education organisations based in Europe
Organizations established in 2008
Quality assurance